Henry Booth Cowles (March 18, 1798 – May 17, 1873) was a U.S. Representative from New York.

Born in Hartford, Connecticut, Cowles moved with his father to Dutchess County, New York, in 1809.
He was graduated from Union College, Schenectady, New York, in 1816.
He studied law.
He was admitted to the bar and commenced practice in Putnam County.
He served as member of the State assembly 1826–1828.

Cowles was elected as an Anti-Jacksonian to the Twenty-first Congress (March 4, 1829 – March 3, 1831).
He moved to New York City in 1834 and practiced law until his death there on May 17, 1873.
He was interred in Rhinebeck Cemetery, Rhinebeck, New York.

References

1798 births
1873 deaths
Politicians from Hartford, Connecticut
Union College (New York) alumni
19th-century American politicians
National Republican Party members of the United States House of Representatives from New York (state)